Limehouse is a 2017 play by the English playwright Steve Waters, dramatizing the discussions on 25 January 1981 which led to the Limehouse Declaration later that day.

Productions
The premiere production of Limehouse opened at the Donmar Warehouse on 2 March 2017 and ran until 15 April. The cast consisted of Nathalie Armin as Deborah Owen, Roger Allam as Roy Jenkins, Tom Goodman-Hill as David Owen, Debra Gillett as Shirley Williams and Paul Chahidi as Bill Rodgers.

References

External links
Donmar Warehouse Listing
Guardian Review

English political plays
2017 plays
Fiction set in 1981
Plays set in England
Plays set in the 1980s
Plays based on actual events